Protozeus kuehnei is an extinct species of fish from the Ypresian epoch Fur Formation of Denmark.

See also

 Archaeozeus – a genus of extinct fish from the same formation

References

Eocene fish
Fossils of Denmark
Fur Formation